Iron Fist, Iron fist or Ironfist may refer to:

Military
 Iron Fist (exercise), an Indian Air Force exercise held in 2013 and 2016
 Iron Fist (countermeasure), an Israeli counter-weapon system
 20th Armoured Brigade (United Kingdom) or The Iron Fist, a British Army armoured formation based in Paderborn, Germany
 Operation Iron Fist (disambiguation)

Music
 Iron Fist (album), a 1982 album by Motörhead
 "Iron Fist" (song)
 Iron Fist, a progenitor of the band Helloween
 "Iron Fist", a song by Die Apokalyptischen Reiter from Soft & Stronger
 "Iron Fist", a song by Goldfinger from Disconnection Notice
 "Iron Fist", a 2013 song by Coheed and Cambria from The Afterman: Descension

Other uses
 Iron Fist (comics), a Marvel Comics superhero
 Iron Fist (TV series), a Netflix series based on the Marvel Comics series
 Iron Fist (novel), a 1998 Star Wars novel by Aaron Allston
Iron Fist, a fictional Super Star Destroyer
 Tekken or Iron Fist, a series of fighting games by Namco
 Dr. Ironfist or Vitali Klitschko, Ukrainian heavyweight boxer
 Puerto Rican anti-crime policy or The iron fist

See also 
 Iron Hand (disambiguation)
 Iron Hands (disambiguation)
 The Man with the Iron Fists, a film starring RZA and Russell Crowe
 Pan Qingfu
 The Way of the Fist: Iron Fist Edition, a box set album by Five Finger Death Punch